Żuków may refer to the following villages in Poland:
Żuków, Lower Silesian Voivodeship (south-west Poland)
Żuków, Włodawa County in Lublin Voivodeship (east Poland)
Żuków, Zamość County in Lublin Voivodeship (east Poland)
Żuków, Busko County in Świętokrzyskie Voivodeship (south-central Poland)
Żuków, Subcarpathian Voivodeship (south-east Poland)
Żuków, Grodzisk Mazowiecki County in Masovian Voivodeship (east-central Poland)
Żuków, Mińsk County in Masovian Voivodeship (east-central Poland)
Żuków, Przysucha County in Masovian Voivodeship (east-central Poland)
Żuków, Siedlce County in Masovian Voivodeship (east-central Poland)
Żuków, Sochaczew County in Masovian Voivodeship (east-central Poland)
Żuków, Lubusz Voivodeship (west Poland)
Żuków, West Pomeranian Voivodeship (north-west Poland)

For places in the Czech Republic, see Žukov (disambiguation)

For places in the Ukraine, see Zhukiv (disambiguation)